Class Clowns is Melbourne International Comedy Festival's development program for young people around the country.

Description
After a competition has been held across the country, heats, semi-finals and then finals are run in each Australian state and territory, with the winners of the state finals competing in the Grand Final in Melbourne.  The Grand Final is held during Melbourne International Comedy Festival at the Forum Theatre (previously held at Melbourne Town Hall and Malthouse Theatre).

Professional comedians who have hosted the grand final include Tom Gleeson and Nath Valvo. Special guest comedians perform a headline set; in the past, these have included Peter Helliar, Tripod, Ross Noble, and Judith Lucy.

Notable comedians who have performed as entrants in Class Clowns include, Josh Thomas, Tom Ballard, Joel Creasey, Rhys Nicholson, Aaron Chen, Velvet Winter, Lauren Duong, Mia Timpano, and Imaan Hadchiti.

Class Clowns National Grand Finalists

See also 
 Melbourne International Comedy Festival
 List of comedians

References

External links 
Official Class Clowns website
http://www.theage.com.au/national/melbourne-life/going-for-the-jocular-20100907-14zmd.html
 Report on Competition (Brazilian News)
 7:30 Report transcript

Australian student comedy